Wendell Mitchell (September 4, 1940 – February 4, 2012) was a Democratic member of the Alabama Senate, representing the 30th District from 1974 to 2010. District 30 includes parts or all of Autauga, Butler, Crenshaw, Elmore, Lowndes, and Pike Counties.

2010 Campaign Endorsements
Wendell Mitchell was endorsed by the following organizations:
 National Rifle Association (NRA)
 Alabama Retail Association
 ALFA Farmers Federation

Mitchell's 2010 campaign information is on his official website.

Professional Biography
Mitchell was a conservative Democratic senator who was known for working across party lines to build better schools, recruit industry, and fund important projects in his district. In 2007, Mitchell’s colleagues in the Senate voted him to the position of Deputy President Pro Tempore, an important role in guiding the future of our state. His seniority in the Alabama Senate made him one of the state’s most effective lawmakers.

Mitchell was chairman of the standing committee on Governmental Affairs in the Senate and chairman of the Joint House–Senate Committee on Energy. He also served as a voting member of every Senate committee by virtue of his position as Deputy President Pro Tempore.

Mitchell earned a bachelor's degree from Auburn University and a law degree from the University of Alabama. He was a past Dean of Jones Law School at Faulkner University and was still active as a Professor of Law at the institution until his death.

He died of congestive heart failure in February 2012.

Accomplishments
A champion for economic development, Mitchell used his experience to create new job opportunities in our area. His efforts included helping land new industries including Hyundai and SMART, as well as providing assistance to keep existing businesses growing.

As Senator for District 30, Mitchell fought for and won more than $36 million in funding for local projects that improved our community. These included the new vocational wing at Greenville High School, the new Health and Fitness Center in Prattville, the Agricultural Pavilion in Autauga County, the Miracle Field for handicapped individuals in Troy, a new baseball complex in Brantley, and equipment for various local fire departments.

Mitchell was a strong supporter of Troy University and Lurleen B. Wallace Community College, which are in his district, as well as being a champion for all educational programs throughout the six counties he represents.

He led the fight to bring prescription drug relief to seniors and to make sure that dollars for education aren’t spent on non-education items.  Mitchell also authored the Alabama Religious Freedom Act to protect the free exercise of religion and sponsored a bill to protect teachers who present alternate points of view concerning human origins in the classroom.

References

External links
 Walking Wendell Mitchell's Website
 Walking Wendell Mitchell's Facebook page
 Alabama State Legislature – Senator "Walking" Wendell Mitchell
 Project Vote Smart – Senator 'Walking' Wendell Mitchell (AL)

1940 births
2012 deaths
Democratic Party Alabama state senators
Auburn University alumni
Politicians from Montgomery, Alabama
University of Alabama School of Law alumni
Lawyers from Montgomery, Alabama
20th-century American lawyers